Sichevița is a commune in Caraș-Severin County, western Romania with a population of 2732 people. It is composed of nineteen villages: Brestelnic, Camenița, Cârșie, Cracu Almăj, Crușovița, Curmătura, Frăsiniș, Gornea (Felsőlupkó), Liborajdea, Lucacevăț, Martinovăț, Ogașu Podului, Sichevița, Streneac, Valea Orevița, Valea Ravensca (Ravenszkavölgy), Valea Sicheviței, Zănou and Zăsloane.

Natives
 Antonie Iorgovan

References

Communes in Caraș-Severin County
Localities in Romanian Banat
Place names of Slavic origin in Romania